Salvador Hernández (born 31 July 1961) is a Mexican judoka. He competed in the men's extra-lightweight event at the 1988 Summer Olympics.

References

1961 births
Living people
Mexican male judoka
Olympic judoka of Mexico
Judoka at the 1988 Summer Olympics
Place of birth missing (living people)